Arcos de Canasí Bacunayagya is a Cuban village and consejo popular ("people's council", i.e. hamlet) of the municipality of Santa Cruz del Norte, in Mayabeque Province. Until 2011, it was part of the former La Habana Province.

History
The town was founded in 1738 at the mouths of the Rio Canasi. Due to frequent flooding, the town was moved to higher ground in 1808, on the actual location.

It was its own municipality (administering an area of ) of the Matanzas Province until 1976, when its territories were re-distributed to the Santa Cruz del Norte municipality of the La Habana Province. With the split of the La Habana Province in 2010, this municipality belongs currently to Mayabeque Province.

Economy
The town's economy is mainly agriculture. Farmers offering cheese and fruit on the side of the Via Blanca highway are an everyday sight.

Intense oil exploitation is active on the coast of the Atlantic Ocean just north of the town.

See also
Jibacoa
Bacunayagua
Boca de Jaruco
Camilo Cienfuegos (Hershey)

References

Populated places in Mayabeque Province